Daedalus is a prominent crater located near the center of the far side of the Moon. The inner wall is terraced, and there is a cluster of central peaks on the relatively flat floor. Because of its location (shielded from radio emissions from the Earth), it has been proposed as the site of a future giant radio telescope, which would be scooped out of the crater itself, much like the Arecibo radio telescope, but on a vastly larger scale.

The crater is named after Daedalus of Greek myth. It is pictured in famous photographs taken by the Apollo 11 astronauts.  In contemporary sources it was called Crater 308 (this was a temporary IAU designation that preceded the establishment of far-side lunar nomenclature).

Nearby craters of note include Icarus to the east and Racah to the south. Less than a crater diameter to the north-northeast is Lipskiy.

Satellite craters 

By convention these features are identified on lunar maps by placing the letter on the side of the crater midpoint that is closest to Daedalus.

See also 
 1864 Daedalus, near-Earth asteroid

References

External links 

 Lunar Orbiter photographic atlas, Photo Number II-033-M

Impact craters on the Moon